Andreas Spielmann (born 26 March 1965) is an Austrian football manager and former footballer who played as a midfielder.

Honours

 Austrian Football Bundesliga: 1988–89

External links
 

1965 births
Living people
Austrian footballers
FC Wacker Innsbruck players
SKN St. Pölten players
First Vienna FC players
Association football midfielders
FC Swarovski Tirol players
Austrian expatriate footballers
Austrian expatriate sportspeople in Greece
Expatriate footballers in Greece